Mary Cecilia Lacity (born May 27, 1963) is a Walton Professor of Information Systems and the Director of the Blockchain Center of Excellence at the University of Arkansas, Sam M. Walton College of Business.

Lacity was previously the Curators’ Distinguished Professor of Information Systems and International Business Fellow at the University of Missouri-St. Louis. She also held the position of visiting scholar at the MIT Center for Information Systems Research. Additionally, she has held visiting positions at the London School of Economics, Washington University, and Oxford University. She is best known for her research in automation, outsourcing and blockchain.

Early life 
Mary Lacity was born May 27, 1963 in Atlantic City, New Jersey. She got her undergraduate degree in Quantitative Business Analysis at Pennsylvania State University in 1985. Before Mary received her PhD, she was a consultant for Technology Partners International and a systems analyst for Exxon. In 1992, she received her Ph.D. in Information Systems from the University of Houston, C.T. Bauer College of Business.

Career

University of Missouri-St. Louis 
Mary Lacity started at the University of Missouri-St. Louis in 1992, and was there for 26 years. Starting as an Assistant Professor of MIS, she moved to associate professor in 1998 and full professor in 2004. In 2012, she became the Curators’ Distinguished Professor of Information Systems, and International Business Fellow. She taught classes on Qualitative Research Methods and The Philosophy of Science and Qualitative Research Methods.

Sam M. Walton College of Business 
After her time at the University of Missouri-St. Louis, Mary Lacity moved to Fayetteville, Arkansas for a position as the Director of the Blockchain Center of Excellence. The goals of the Blockchain Center of Excellence are to develop research partnerships, promote the dissemination of knowledge about blockchain, and push industry adoption of blockchain technology.

Other roles 
Mary Lacity has served in many different roles in her career. She held the position of visiting scholar at the MIT Center for Information Systems Research. Additionally, she has held visiting positions at the London School of Economics, Washington University, and Oxford University. She is also a Certified Outsourcing Professional. She is a coeditor of the Palgrave Series: Work, Technology, and Globalization, senior editor of MIS Quarterly Executive and Journal of Information Technology Teaching Cases, and on the editorial boards for the Journal of Information Technology, the Journal of Strategic Information Systems, IEEE Transactions on Engineering Management, and Strategic Outsourcing: An International Journal.

Additionally, Mary is an industry advisor for Symphony Ventures and a member of the IAOP Outsourcing Hall of Fame. She received the 2000 World Outsourcing Achievement Award and 2008 Gateway to Innovation Award. Her publications have appeared in Harvard Business Review, Sloan Management Review, MIS Quarterly, IEEE Computer, and Communications of the ACM.

Books 
 Information Systems Outsourcing: Myths, Metaphors and Realities (1993) 
 Beyond The Information Systems Outsourcing Bandwagon: The Insourcing Response (1995) 
 Inside Information Technology Outsourcing: A State-of-the-art Report (2000) 
 Global Information Technology Outsourcing: In Search of Business Advantage (2001) 
 Netsourcing: Renting Business Applications and Services Over a Network (2002) 
 Outsourcing: All You Need to Know (2004) 
 Information Systems and Outsourcing (2008) 
 Information Systems and Outsourcing: Studies in Theory and Practice (2008) 
 Offshore Outsourcing of It Work (2008) 
 The Practice of Outsourcing: From Information Systems to BPO and Offshoring (2009) 
 Emerging ITO and BPO Markets: Rural Sourcing and Impact Sourcing (2012) 
 The Rise of Legal Services Outsourcing: Risk and Opportunity (2014) 
 South Africa’s BPO Service Advantage: Becoming Strategic in the Global Marketplace (2015) 
 Nine Keys to World-Class Business Process Outsourcing (2015) 
 Service Automation: Robots and the Future of Work (2016) 
 Robotic Process Automation and Risk Mitigation: The Definitive Guide (2017) 
 Robotic Process and Cognitive Automation (2018) 
 A Manager's Guide to Blockchains for Business (2018) 
 Becoming Strategic with Robotic Process Automation (2019) 
 Blockchain Foundations For the Internet of Value (2020)

References

External links

People associated with cryptocurrency
Living people
1963 births
People from Margate City, New Jersey
University of Arkansas faculty
Pennsylvania State University alumni
University of Houston alumni
Database researchers
American women computer scientists
American computer scientists
Information systems researchers
University of Missouri–St. Louis faculty
American women academics